Jauniūnai is a village in the Širvintos District Municipality, Lithuania. It is near the A2 highway and European route E272. It had 185 residents at the time of the 2001 census.

Jauniūnai has a natural gas compression station, which is why the village was selected as the terminus of the planned Lithuania–Poland pipeline.

References 

Villages in Vilnius County
Širvintos District Municipality